Alidius Warmoldus Lambertus Tjarda van Starkenborgh Stachouwer (7 March 1888 – 16 August 1978) was a Dutch nobleman and statesman, primarily noted for being the last colonial Governor-General of the Dutch East Indies, now Indonesia.  He was taken captive after accepting Japan's demands for an unconditional surrender of the islands on 9 March 1942.

Early life
In November 1915 he married Christine Marburg, the daughter of the American Ambassador to Belgium, Theodore Marburg.

He joined the Dutch diplomatic service in 1915. Prior to World War II, he was Queen's Commissioner in Groningen (1925–33) and envoy to Brussels (1933–36).

On 16 September 1936, he became Governor-General of the Netherlands East Indies.

Second World War

When the Netherlands surrendered to Germany on 14 May 1940, Jhr. van Starkenborgh declared martial law in the Dutch East Indies, ordering 19 German cargo ships to be seized and all German nationals to be interned pending the liberation of the Netherlands.

In December 1941, when Japan began operations in the Pacific, there were 93,000 Dutch troops and 5,000 American, British and Australian soldiers to defend against an invasion of the Netherlands East Indies.

By 15 February, Japanese bombers were attacking the capital at Batavia (now Jakarta) and government operations were removed to Bandoeng.  On Sunday, 8 March, Lt. Gen. Hitoshi Imamura met with van Starkenborgh and set a deadline for an unconditional surrender.  Jhr. van Starkenborgh ordered the Dutch and Allied troops to cease fire in a broadcast the next day, and the Allied forces surrendered at 1:00 p.m.

Tjarda van Starkenborgh, his family, and other Dutch government and military personnel were taken prisoner. While the Japanese offered him to let him stay at his home under house arrest and receive special treatment he refused.  He was separated from his wife, Christine, and daughters, who were interned in a different POW camp.

Later, he was transferred to the Manchurian camp at Hsien (now Liaoyuan), where he was held along with other prominent prisoners, including General Jonathan M. Wainwright, until the camp was liberated on 16 August 1945.

Post-war life
Jhr. van Starkenborgh returned to the Netherlands with his family, but declined a request from Queen Wilhelmina to serve as Governor-General, in that the Queen had pledged self-government to Indonesia in 1942.  He resigned effective 16 October 1945.  Instead, he became the Dutch Ambassador to France (1945–48) and was then the Dutch Representative to NATO (1950–56).

After his retirement he settled a long-standing argument on canal links with Belgium in negotiations during 1963–66. With Gerbrandy and Beel, he formed an advisory committee on the Greet Hofmans affair.

References

1888 births
1978 deaths
Ambassadors of the Netherlands to France
Permanent Representatives of the Netherlands to NATO
Jonkheers of the Netherlands
Governors-General of the Dutch East Indies
People from Groningen (city)
World War II civilian prisoners held by Japan
King's and Queen's Commissioners of Groningen
20th-century Dutch East Indies people